Chakravakam is a 1974 Indian Malayalam film, directed by Thoppil Bhasi. The film stars Prem Nazir, Kaviyoor Ponnamma, KPAC Lalitha and Adoor Bhasi in the lead roles. The film has musical score by Shankar–Ganesh.

Cast

Prem Nazir as Raghavan
Kaviyoor Ponnamma as Soshamma
KPAC Lalitha as Branti Paru
Adoor Bhasi as Sankaran
Mani
Shanthi
T. S. Muthaiah as Devassia's father
Baby Shanthi
Indira
Mohanan
Oduvil Unnikrishnan as Mammad
Paravoor Bharathan as Devassia
Sujatha as Devaki
Sumithra as Padmini
Treesa

Soundtrack
The music was composed by Shankar–Ganesh and the lyrics were written by Vayalar Ramavarma.

References

External links
 

1974 films
1970s Malayalam-language films
Films scored by Shankar–Ganesh
Films directed by Thoppil Bhasi